Rodrigo Frauches de Souza Santos (born September 28, 1992 in São João de Meriti), known as just Rodrigo Frauches or Frauches, is a Brazilian football centre back.

Career

Career statistics
(Correct )

according to combined sources on the Flamengo official website and Flaestatística.

Honours

Club
Flamengo
Copa do Brasil: 2013
Campeonato Carioca: 2014

National Team
Brazil U-18
Copa Internacional do Mediterrâneo: 2011

Brazil U-20
FIFA U-20 World Cup: 2011

Contract
 Flamengo - March, 2016

References

External links
 
 
Player Profile @ Flapédia 

1992 births
Living people
Brazilian footballers
Brazil under-20 international footballers
Brazilian expatriate footballers
Association football defenders
Campeonato Brasileiro Série A players
CR Flamengo footballers
Rodrigo Frauches
Expatriate footballers in Thailand
Rodrigo Frauches
People from São João de Meriti
Sportspeople from Rio de Janeiro (state)